Clara Villarosa is an American entrepreneur, author, publisher and motivational speaker. She is the co-founder of Villarosa Media and was the founder of Hue-Man Bookstores in Denver, Colorado and Harlem, New York, one of the highest earning African-American bookstores in the country from the 1980s to the 2010s.  Her book, Down to Business: The First 10 Steps to Entrepreneurship for Women was nominated for a NAACP Image Award. Villarosa founded the African American Booksellers Association.

In January 2016, she co-founded Villarosa Media with her daughters, Linda Villarosa and Alicia Villarosa. The company focuses on publishing new books from established black authors and classic books reissued in digital formats with print on demand (POD) capability. Its first published book was The Wind Is Spirit: The Life, Love and Legacy of Audre Lorde. In 2016, she was featured in the film, Dream, Girl.

Early life and education
Born in 1930, Villarosa was raised in Chicago. She earned a bachelor's degree in education and psychology at Roosevelt University and a master's degree in social work from Loyola University. Following her studies, she worked until 1959 as a psychiatric social worker at Mount Sinai Hospital in Chicago before becoming a full-time mother. The family later moved to Denver, Colorado where Villarosa became the chief psychiatric social worker at the Department of Behavioral Science at Denver's Children's Hospital and later director of the department. Villarosa later attended the Graduate School of Social Work Doctoral Program and College of Law at the University of Denver. She worked temporarily as the employee relations manager at the United Bank of Denver during this time and later became Vice president of Human Resources and Strategic Planning.

Entrepreneurial career 
Villarosa opened the Hue-Man Experience Bookstore in Denver in 1984. After 16 years, Villarosa sold the Denver bookstore in 2000. She moved to New York City and opened the Hue-Man Bookstore & Cafe in Harlem featuring a large collection of books by African-American authors. The store was located near the Apollo Theatre and became the largest African-American bookstore in the country. It hosted events featuring former President Bill Clinton, Terry McMillan, James Baldwin, Colin Powell, Wynton Marsalis, and Toni Morrison. Maya Angelou read at the store's opening.

In January 2016, at the age of 85, she co-founded Villarosa Media with her daughters, Linda and Alicia Villarosa. The company focuses on publishing new books from established black authors and classic books reissued in digital formats with print on demand (POD) capability. Its first published book was The Wind Is Spirit: The Life, Love and Legacy of Audre Lorde.

Other work
As of January 2017, Villarosa is on the board of trustees for the University of Denver. Villarosa founded the African American Booksellers Association. She previously served on the boards of Colorado Small Business Development Center,  Malcolm X and Dr. Betty Shabazz Memorial and Educational Center, and the New Federal Theatre.

Books
 Down to Business: The First 10 Steps to Entrepreneurship for Women (2009), Penguin, 
 The Words of African-American Heroes (2011), Harper Collins,

See also 

 NAACP Image Award for Outstanding Literary Work, Instructional
 List of women writers

References

External links
 
 Villarosa Media

1930 births
Living people
African-American writers
American business writers
Women business writers
African-American businesspeople
Businesspeople from Chicago
Writers from Chicago
American women non-fiction writers
21st-century African-American people
21st-century African-American women
20th-century African-American people
20th-century African-American women
African-American women writers